Bloom Forever is the debut album by Thomas Cohen, recorded for Stolen Recordings, released on 6 May 2016.

Critical reception 
The album received generally positive reviews from music critics.

References

Indie rock albums by English artists
2016 debut albums